Narellan Jets Rugby League Football Club is an Australian rugby league football club based in Narellan, New South Wales the club was formed in 1977..

Notable players 
Ben Roberts
Shannon Gallant
Rocky Trimarchi
Matt King
Sean Keppie
Peni Terepo
 Tyrone “Moki” Donaghue

References

External links
Narellan Jets RLFC Fox Sports pulse

Rugby league teams in Sydney
Rugby clubs established in 1977
1977 establishments in Australia
Narellan, New South Wales